The Sinclair ZX Printer is a spark printer which was produced by Sinclair Research for its ZX81 home computer. It was launched in 1981, with a recommended retail price of £49.95.

To mark the paper, one of the printer's two styluses passed a current through a small area of the aluminium layer, causing the aluminium to evaporate and reveal the black under-surface. The printer's horizontal resolution was the same as the ZX81's video display, i.e. 256 dots (pixels) or 32 characters (using the standard character definition).

The ZX Printer was never intended for word processing purposes, instead being aimed at users who wanted to obtain program listings for reference purposes.

The ZX Printer was also compatible with the earlier ZX80 computer (when fitted with the 8kB ROM upgrade) and the later ZX Spectrum, and plugged directly into the expansion bus connector via a short cable.  The expansion bus was duplicated on the outside of the printer's connector, allowing other peripherals to be connected concurrently.  The printer drew its power directly from the expansion bus, and was sold with a larger (1-2A) power supply for the ZX81 to accommodate the additional power drain.  The Spectrum's user manual noted that this was not needed for the Spectrum as its default 1.1A power supply was sufficient.

The peripheral was affectionately referred to during the 1980s by users in the UK home computing community (many of whom were teenagers) as 'The Astronaut's Bog Roll'  ('bog roll' being common English vernacular for toilet paper, and the astronaut reference pertaining to the silvery, glittery appearance of the ZX Printer's paper). The printer itself also bore more than a passing resemblance to a 1980s-era toilet-roll dispenser, in terms of its visual design.

Competing printers
The Alphacom 32 was a thermal printer that used the same interface, and therefore could be driven by a ZX81 or Spectrum without additional software. Unlike the ZX Printer, it had a separate power supply, and made use of standard thermal paper rolls which remain widely available.

See also
 ZX Spectrum
 Sinclair Research

References

External links
 Planet Sinclair: ZX Printer
 Ian Adamson; Richard Kennedy. Sinclair and the 'Sunrise' Technology., Penguin Books, 1986
 comp.sys.sinclair FAQ: Peripherals: Printers

Computer-related introductions in 1981
Home computer peripherals
Sinclair Research